Oskar Herrfurth (5 February 1862 – 1934) was a German painter and illustrator.

Life 
Born in Merseburg, Herrfurth received his education at the art school in Weimar, where he lived for many years, later then in Hamburg. He created genre paintings as well as fairy tale pictures and worked as illustrator. He illustrated, among other things, the tall tales of Karl Friedrich Hieronymus Freiherr von Münchhausen, works by Karl May as well as Grimms' Fairy Tales and fairy tales by Hans Christian Andersen and Ludwig Bechstein.

Work 
Illustrator of the following postcard series, all published by Uvachrom:
 Münchhausen, 2 six-part series
 Eulenspiegel, six-part series
 Die Bremer Stadtmusikanten (Grimm brothers), six-part series
 Der kleine Däumling (Bechstein), six-part series
 Der Schweinehirt (Andersen), six-part series, 1920
 Die sieben Raben (Grimm brothers), six-part series
 Der Rattenfänger von Hameln, six-part series
 Siebenschön (Bechstein), six-part series
 Der Wolf und die sieben Geißlein (Grimm brothers), six-part series
 Marienkind (Grimm brothers), six-part series
 Das Schlaraffenland, six-part series
 Die Heinzelmännchen, six-part series

Illustrated books:
  by Karl May. With one color cover image and 16 tone print images. 4th edition. Stuttgart among others: Union Deutsche Verlagsgesellschaft (1904).
 Karl May. Der Ölprinz. With 16 colour print images. 5th and last edition. Stuttgart among others: Union Deutsche Verlagsgesellschaft (1909).

Literature 
 Hans Ries: Illustration und Illustratoren des Kinder- und Jugendbuchs im deutschsprachigen Raum 1871–1914. Osnabrück, im Verlag Wenner 1992. .

References

External links 
 
 Postcard Illustrations by Oskar Herrfurthth-century 
 Münchhausens Abenteuer in Bildern von Oskar Herrfurth Serie I
 Münchhausens Abenteuer in Bildern von Oskar Herrfurth Serie II 
 Der Rattenfänger von Hameln, Postkartenserie von Oskar Herrfurth
 Die Bremer Stadtmusikanten, Postkartenserie von Oskar Herrfurth
 Der Wolf und die sieben Geißlein, Postkartenserie von Oskar Herrfurth
 Das Märchen vom Schlaraffenland, Postkartenserie von Oskar Herrfurth
 Das Marienkind, Postkartenserie von Oskar Herrfurth

19th-century German painters
19th-century German male artists
German illustrators
1862 births
1934 deaths
People from Merseburg
20th-century German painters
20th-century German male artists